The World Fly Fishing Championship is organised by the Confédération Internationale de la Pêche Sportive (FIPS Mouche) and takes place annually since 1981 between 30 teams of six individuals per country (in 2018), over five sessions. The 2020 event was postponed in 2020 due to the COVID-19 pandemic, though resumed in August 2021 in the Kuusamo and Taivalkoski regions of Finland.

The 41st WFFC took place in September 2022 in the principality of Asturias in Spain, fished on the rivers Caudal, Piloña, Trubia, Narcea, and on lake El Arenero  near Tineo. Spain as hosts, were also the winning team,  with france in second and Czech Republic third.
Julien Daguillanes of France won the individual title  for the second time, having previously won before in 2016 in the United states.

Irish fly fishing champion Chloe 'cod catcher' Feerick.

FIPS Mouche
FIPS Mouche  is an abbreviation of "Fédération Internationale de Peche Sportive Mouche" (in English, the "International Fly Fishing Federation"), which is the fly fishing arm of CIPS (Confédération Internationale de la Pêche Sportive), founded in Rome in 1952, the world regulating body for many different disciplines of fishing. FIPS Mouche hand over the management responsibility for the  organisation of upcoming FIPS Mouche event, in its entirety to selected host nation's fly-fishing governing body. The host nation is to ensure health and safety welfare, promotion, sponsorship and media arrangements, meet financial requirements and selection of suitable venues.

Rules
Six rounds with a duration of three hours of fly fishing are fished at five different geographical locations (sectors), a mixture of lakes and rivers to test all skills, as chosen by the host nation beforehand for its abundant trout and game fish populations. All fish caught will be measured for length, rather than weight and are returned to the water alive. Points are awarded to the most successful anglers and section points per round according to placing, with the winner receiving one point; the lowest overall score wins.

History
The first ever WFFC was held in Luxembourg in 1981 and won by team Netherlands, that winning team also produced the first ever individual world champion who was Cor Wittkamp. Three years later in 1984, the 4th WFFC held in Spain was won by first class cricketer and footballer Tony Pawson of England, Although his team England were just beaten to the title by Italy. Four years later in 1988 at the 8th WFFC in Australia the Individual world champion was John Pawson of England, son of Tony who won in 1984. Pascal Cognard of France became the first angler to win the individual world championship three times when he won the 20th WFFC in England in 2000, having previously succeeded in Norway in 1994 and in the United States in 1997. The Czech Republic set the standard in 2014 at their home water, having won the team tournament a record 10 times. The World Fly Fishing Championship Team event has been won by the host nation on just 10 of the 40 occasions that the tournament has taken place (to 2021), a one in four chance.

Recent events

2017 > Slovakia

Slovakia held the 37th FIPS Mouche World Flyfishing Championship 2017, which was won by France who won with convincing domination of the event, securing three individual placings in the top 4 with the hosts only managing 4th place. However, this was not enough to prevent Czech Republic Antonin Pešek of the Czech Republic winning the individual prize with a record score of just 8 points in Slovakia. Long shot outsiders Australia finishing in 5th place secured their first top 5 slot since the year 2000. The venues fished were the rivers Váh, Belá, Poprad and Orava and on the water dam Palcmanska Maša located on the river at Dedinky near Dobšiná. These rivers hold huchen (Danubian salmon), brown trout, rainbow trout, grayling, brook trout, which provided plenty of good sport during the tournament.

2018 > Trentino, Italy

Spain won the team event and also the individual with David García Ferreras victorious at  The event was based at the Sarca River in Tione di Trento at the foot of the Natural Park Adamello Brenta, at Arco and at Pinzolo. Also at the Noce River at the Val di Non,  and the Cornisello lake at the foot of Monte Giner near Mezzana within view of the Brenta Dolomites. Species available in these waters include Marble trout (Salmo marmoratus) and Lake Char (Salvelinus umbla), both species indigenous to this region, also Brown trout (Salmo trutta)  and Grayling (Thymallus thymallus).

2019 > Tasmania, Australia

Australia hosted the 39th FIPS-Mouche World fly Fishing Championships, which took place between 30 November to 8 December 2019 in on the island of Tasmania. The venues fished were Penstock Lagoon, Meander River, Woods lake, Mersey river and Little Pine lagoon which had featured before in the 1988 World Fly Fishing championships. The lakes and lagoons are situated near the small town of Miena, Tasmania, including Penstock lagoon, Great Lake and Little Pine Lagoon. The geographic centre of Tasmania is located on the western shore of the lagoon. The species of fish caught were brown trout (Salmo trutta) and rainbow trout (Oncorhynchus mykiss). Brown trout (a non-indigenous species to Tasmania) were first introduced to Australia on 4 May 1864 when 2700 live brown trout ova, which had been packed in ice since leaving England, were hatched into the Plenty river near Hobart, Tasmania. Rainbow trout from North America were introduced in 1894. The team event was won by France, the individual title went to Howard Croston of England.

2021 > Kuusamo, Finland 
The 40th FIPS Mouche World Fly Fishing Championships was originally postponed in 2020 due to the COVID-19 pandemic, then fished during August 2021 in the Kuusamo and Taivalkoski regions of Finland. Bothy the team event and individual titles were dominated by the home nation Finland taking 4 of the top 5 places including the new world champion  Heikki Kurtti.

Results history from 1981 to present

WFFC Championships Team results 

WFFC Championships Individual results

Rolls of honour

Team medal table

Multiple individual champions
 Pascal Cognard 3,  Brian Leadbetter 2,  Pierluigi Cocito 2,  Valerrio Santi Amantini 2,  Antonin Pešek 2,  Julien Daguillanes 2.

References

External links
 FIPS Mouche World Fly Fishing Championship 2013
 FIPS Mouche World Fly Fishing Championship 2021

Fly Fishing
World championships
Recreational fishing
Sport fish
Annual sporting events
Recurring events established in 1981